Dream Painter is a compilation album by American country singer Connie Smith. It was released in July 1973 via RCA Victor and contained ten tracks. The album was released following Smith's departure from RCA Victor and contained previously-released material. Two new recordings were also featured, including the title track. Released as a single, the title track would reach the top 30 of American country songs chart. The album itself would chart the American country LP's chart in 1973.

Background, recording and content
Connie Smith reached the peak of her commercial career while recording for the RCA Victor label. Between 1964 and 1973, she would have 18 top ten country singles and release a series of albums. In 1973, Smith left her contract and switched to Columbia Records. When Smith transitioned to Columbia, RCA Victor released several LP's that compiled some of Smith's most popular recordings, singles and album cuts. Among the RCA compilations released during this period was Dream Painter in 1973. The album contained ten tracks in total, eight of which were previously released. Among these previously-released songs was the track "Tiny Blue Transistor Radio", which originally appeared as B-side to Smith's 1965 single "Then and Only Then". 

Two new recordings were also part of the Dream Painter track listing. The title track was one new recording, penned by Dallas Frazier and Sanger D. Shafer. Frazier had been a close friend of Smith's and she had previously cut a series of songs penned by him. A second new recording was the gospel track, "All the Praises". In 1974, the song was nominated by the Grammy Awards for Best Inspirational Performance. The album's two new recordings were cut in sessions held in 1972. The eight previously-released tracks were recorded between 1964 and 1972 at RCA Victor Studios in Nashville, Tennessee. All sessions were produced by Bob Ferguson.

Release and reception
Dream Painter was released by the RCA Victor label in July 1973. It was distributed as a vinyl LP, containing five songs on either side of the record. The album debuted on the American Billboard Country LP's chart on August 11, 1973. It spent seven weeks on the chart before peaking at the number 39 position on September 15, 1973. Following its release, Billboard magazine gave the disc a positive response when reviewing the album: "RCA has reached again into its files to get fine cuts by its departed (to Columbia) Connie Smith, and comes up with enough to make it a fine album." The title track was released as a single prior in June 1973. Later that year, the single reached number 23 on the Billboard Hot Country Songs chart and number 39 on Canada's RPM Country chart.

Track listing

Chart performance

Release history

References

Footnotes

Books

 
 

1973 compilation albums
Albums produced by Bob Ferguson (music)
Connie Smith compilation albums
RCA Records compilation albums